A castle town is a settlement built adjacent to or surrounding a castle. Castle towns were common in Medieval Europe.  Some examples include small towns like Alnwick and Arundel, which are still dominated by their castles. In Western Europe, and England particularly, it is common for cities and towns that were not castle towns to instead have been organized around cathedrals.

Towns organized around Japanese castles are called jōkamachi . Castles are typically built near towns to gain and equip supplies.

See also

Castles and Town Walls of King Edward in Gwynedd
Jōkamachi
Urban castle

References

Castles
Types of towns
Urban planning during medieval period
Urban planning during early modern period